is a town located in Hayami District, Ōita Prefecture, Japan. As of March 2017, the town has an estimated population of 28,524 and the density of 390 persons per km2. The total area is 73.32 km2.

Geography 
Hiji is located within the eastern part of Ōita Prefecture and borders with the Beppu Bay.

Neighbouring municipalities 

 Beppu
 Kitsuki
 Usa

Transportation

Railway 

 JR Kyushu
 Nippō Main Line: Ōga - Hiji - Yōkoku - Bungo-Toyooka

Highways 

 Ōita Expressway
 Higashikyushu Expressway
 Japan national routes
 Route 10
 Route 213
 Route 500

Places of interests 
The town has a trappist monastery and is also the home of Sanrio's Harmonyland theme park.

References

External links

 Town of Hiji 

Towns in Ōita Prefecture